Saint Peregrinus was the Bishop of Terni, and was credited for founding the city's cathedral.

References

138 deaths
2nd-century Christian saints
2nd-century Italian bishops
Italian saints
Year of birth unknown